David Larson is a paralympic athlete from the United States competing mainly in category T34 sprint events.

Larson has competed for the United States at four Paralympics, his first was in 1988 where he won bronze in both the 100m and 400m as well as competing in the club throwing event.  The 1992 Summer Paralympics in Barcelona turned out to be special for David as he won gold in the 100m, 200m, 400m and 800m.  Larson's third games were in 1996 Summer Paralympics in his home country, there he won defended his 400m title and won bronze in the 100m.  His final games came in 2000 where he competed in the 100m, 200m and 400m but failed to medal in any of them.

References

External links 
 

Paralympic track and field athletes of the United States
Athletes (track and field) at the 1988 Summer Paralympics
Athletes (track and field) at the 1992 Summer Paralympics
Athletes (track and field) at the 1996 Summer Paralympics
Athletes (track and field) at the 2000 Summer Paralympics
Paralympic gold medalists for the United States
Paralympic bronze medalists for the United States
American male sprinters
American male middle-distance runners
Living people
Year of birth missing (living people)
Medalists at the 1988 Summer Paralympics
Medalists at the 1992 Summer Paralympics
Medalists at the 1996 Summer Paralympics
Paralympic medalists in athletics (track and field)